Myomeres are blocks of skeletal muscle tissue arranged in sequence, commonly found in aquatic chordates. Myomeres are separated from adjacent myomeres by connective fascia (myosepta) and most easily seen in larval fishes or in the olm. Myomere counts are sometimes used for identifying specimens, since their number corresponds to the number of vertebrae in the adults. Location varies, with some species containing these only near the tails, while some have them located near the scapular or pelvic girdles. Depending on the species, myomeres could be arranged in an epaxial or hypaxial manner. Hypaxial refers to ventral muscles and related structures while epaxial refers to more dorsal muscles. The horizontal septum divides these two regions in vertebrates from cyclostomes to gnathostomes. In terrestrial chordates, the myomeres become fused as well as indistinct, due to the disappearance of myosepta.

Shape 

The shape of myomeres varies by species. Myomeres are commonly zig-zag, "V" (lancelets), "W" (fishes), or straight (tetrapods)– shaped muscle fibers. Generally, cyclostome myomeres are arranged in vertical strips while those of jawed fishes are folded in a complex matter due to swimming capability evolution. Specifically, myomeres of elasmobranchs and eels are “W”-shaped. Contrastingly, myomeres of tetrapods run vertically and do not display complex folding. Another species with simply-lain myomeres are mudpuppies. Myomeres overlap each other in succession, meaning myomere activation also allows neighboring myomeres to activate.

Myomeres are made up of myoglobin-rich dark muscle as well as white muscle. Dark muscle, generally, functions as slow-twitch muscle fibers while white muscle is composed of fast-twitch fibers.

Function 
Specifically, three types of myomeres in fish-like chordates include amphioxine (lancelet), cyclostomine (jawless fish), and gnathostomine (jawed fish). A common function shared by all of these is that they function to flex the body laterally into concavity to provide force for locomotion.

Since myomeres are composed of multinucleated myofibers (contractile cells), force can be generated via muscle contraction that gets transmitted by the intricate connective tissue (myosepta) network.

Function in fishes 
The folded shape of each myomere as "V" or "W" shaped extends over various axial segments, allowing fibers control over a large amount of the body. Specifically, myomeres are overlapping cones bound by connective tissue. Myomeres compose most of the lateral musculature and provide propulsive force to travel along the line of travel. In this sense, they cause flexion to either side in order to produce locomotor force. Myomeres attach to centra of vertebrae, and neural and haemal spines.

Further, myomeres of fish are divided by a horizontal septum into dorsal (epaxial) and ventral (hypaxial) sections as mentioned in previous paragraphs. Further, spinal nerves pass into each myomere.

There are different variations of myomere activation depending on the type of swimming or movement. For example, high loading situations such as fast-starts and turning require almost maximal myomere activation in teleost fish. Further, if swim speeds are lower and movement is in one plane, there is less activation of myomeres. Further, research has discovered that fish are able to spatially restrict axial myomeres during different swimming behaviors.

Some research theorizes that myomeres play additional roles in for the fish beyond force generation for swimming. For example, this microdissection and polarized light microscopy research suggests that anterior myomeres have elongated and reinforced dorsal posterior cones that allow epaxial muscle force to be transmitted to the neurocranium for elevation during suction feeding.

Specific taxa

Fossils 
Published information on Pikaia gracilens (a well-known Cambrian era fossil) explains evolution of swimming ability in chordates related to myomere shape and function. Specifically, myomeres in this species possessed minimal overlap between successive ones and myosepta dividing them were gently curved. In a biomechanical evaluation, it is presumed that Pikaia were not capable of rapid swimming like in living chordates. Several theories for this idea include lacking fast-twitch muscle fibers, ancestral muscle fiber types more like modern slow-twitch fibers, and less tension on myosepta due to less overlap between successive myomeres.

Larval fish and Amphioxus 
Larval fish and amphioxus myomeres are "V"-shaped. They are involved in the specialized notochord of amphioxus. There are muscle cells within myomeres that send, and synapse cytoplasmic extensions of muscle cells with contractile fibrils to the nerve cord surface.

In amphioxus, myomeres run longitudinally along the length of the body in a "V"-shape. As sequential contraction for swimming occurs, force from the myomeres is transmitted via connective tissues to the notochord.

Zebrafish 
The tail-bending maneuver generated by myomeres in zebrafish requires innervation from motor neurons for both the hypaxial and epaxial muscle regions. It has been found that timing/intensity of neurons firing in these two regions varies, respectively. This process is mediated by a circuit that controls motor neuron activation during swimming behaviors, which, in turn, affects force generation. Similar to this idea, one study found that hypaxial and epaxial myomere activation did not always correlate with myomeric fibers closer to the horizontal septum itself.

Tetrapods 
Myomeres run vertically and do not undergo folding like in bony fishes. Further, in higher order vertebrates, myomeres are fused and run longitudinally. Myosepta that divides myomeres are completely obsolete in amniotes.

Myomeres also play a role in swimming in adult newts. Specifically, epaxial myomeres located opposite to each other at the same longitudinal site alternate rhythmic contraction. During stepping on the ground, the myomeres of the mid-trunk undergo bursts of contraction that are synchronized in contrast to double bursting patterns (in opposite directions) expressed in the anterior and posterior trunks.

In salamanders, hypaxial muscles, myomeres, and myosepta run in a straight line mid-laterally to mid-ventrally. Specifically, the orientation of collagen fibers within these myomeres runs mediolateral. It is also theorized that, in salamanders, myosepta increase the amplification of strain of angled muscle fibers. This controls  how myomeres bulge during contraction in what is called the 'bulge control hypothesis'.

Eels 
Eel myomeres are "W"-shaped and cover the entire body. Within these is a mucosal-like matrix that is a-cellular. Superficial to these myomeres is an epithelial layer.

Mudpuppy 
Salamanders in the genus Necturus (mudpuppies) are a salamander species with simply-lain myomeres, unlike the complex nature of bony fishes.

Chondrichthyes 
The myomeres of some Chondrichthyes, specifically sharks, are "W"-shaped. Thus, function in Chondrichthyes is similar to that of bony fish, where myomeres contribute to propulsive force for locomotion.

Leptocephali 
Leptocephalus myomeres are "W"-shaped and extend from head all the way to the tail. Distinguishing eels can be done through evaluation of the number of myomeres (European has 112-119 while American has 103–11).

References 

Wikipedia Student Program
Physiology
Muscular system
Chordate anatomy